Anatoliy Korolkov was a Soviet sprint canoer who competed in the late 1970s. He won a gold medal in the K-2 10000 m event at the 1977 ICF Canoe Sprint World Championships in Sofia.

References

Living people
Soviet male canoeists
Year of birth missing (living people)
ICF Canoe Sprint World Championships medalists in kayak